Pyrenaria is a genus of flowering plants in the family Theaceae.

It contains the following species:

Pyrenaria acuminata 
Pyrenaria attenuata 
Pyrenaria barringtoniifolia 
Pyrenaria cherrapunjeana 
Pyrenaria diospyricarpa 
Pyrenaria hirta 
Pyrenaria johorensis 
Pyrenaria jonquieriana 
Pyrenaria khasiana 
Pyrenaria kwangsiensis 
Pyrenaria laotica 
Pyrenaria maculatoclada 
Pyrenaria menglaensis 
Pyrenaria microcarpa 
Pyrenaria microphylla 
Pyrenaria mindanaensis 
Pyrenaria multisepala 
Pyrenaria oblongicarpa 
Pyrenaria pahangensis 
Pyrenaria pingpienensis 
Pyrenaria poilaneana 
Pyrenaria serrata 
Pyrenaria sophiae 
Pyrenaria spectabilis 
Pyrenaria tawauensis 
Pyrenaria villosula 
Pyrenaria viridifolia 
Pyrenaria wuana

References

Theaceae
Ericales genera
Taxonomy articles created by Polbot